Street Fighter is the soundtrack to Steven E. de Souza 1994 action film Street Fighter. It was released on December 6, 1994, by Priority Records, and consists primarily of hip hop music. Several notable artists from the genre were featured, including Ice Cube, MC Hammer and Nas.

The soundtrack found some success on the Billboard charts, peaking at No. 135 on the Billboard 200 and No. 34 on the Top R&B/Hip-Hop Albums. It featured one charting single by Rally Ral, "Something Kinda Funky", which reached No. 39 on the Hot Rap Singles. "Straight to My Feet" by Hammer and Deion Sanders, was the only single released in the United Kingdom, where it charted at No. 57.

The album sold over 500,000 units in the United States.

Track listing

Chart history

References

External links

1994 soundtrack albums
Hip hop soundtracks
Albums produced by Laylaw
Albums produced by E-A-Ski
Albums produced by MC Hammer
Priority Records soundtracks
Albums produced by Easy Mo Bee
Works based on Street Fighter
Action film soundtracks